Isolino Partegora (known locally as Isulin) is an islet situated at the centre of the gulf of Angera on Lago Maggiore, the only island on the lake to fall within the Italian region Lombardy. Most of the shoreline consists of marshy cane thickets, although there is a sandy beach at the southern edge of the island.

The islet is about 96 by 36 m in size, with an area of roughly 3500 square metres.

Sass margunin, or margunée, is a submerged erratic block lying some tens of metres to the west of the island.

Near the shore facing the island is the Oasis of Bruschera natural park.

It is said that the saints Giulio and Giuliano stopped on the island. Tradition also identifies Partegora as the location of the martyrdom of Arialdo Alciato, the Milanese deacon and Patarine reformist who was assassinated in 1076 at the prompting of his archbishop, Guido da Velate. In 1776 Alessandro Volta, while a guest of the Castiglioni family in Angera, discovered marsh gas, or methane, here.

References

Islands of Lombardy
Islands of Lake Maggiore in Italy